Al Menbar may refer to either of two political organizations in Bahrain:
 Al-Menbar Islamic Society
 Al-Menbar Progressive Democratic Society 
 Al-Menbar Media. A media company established by Yasser Al-Habib

See also
 Minbar, the type of pulpit